Badryash (Bäźräş) is a rural locality (a village) in Kisak-Kainsky Selsoviet, Yanaulsky District, Bashkortostan, Russia. The population was 50 as of 2010.

Geography 
Badryash is located 22 km west of Yanaul (the district's administrative centre) by road. Progress is the nearest rural locality.

References 

Rural localities in Yanaulsky District